EBP may refer to:

 EBP (gene), encoding the emopamil binding protein
 Earth BioGenome Project
 EBP register, a processor register in the IA-32 instruction set, typically used to hold the stack base pointer (the address of the current stack frame)
 Education Business Partnership, in the United Kingdom
 Estradiol-binding protein
 Evidence-based policing
 Evidence-based policy, in public policy 
 Evidence-based practice, in medicine
 Efficiency Bandwidth Product, one of the Thiele/Small parameters
 Eurasian Boxing Parliament, boxing organisation.